Hong dou tang or Hong dou sha is a popular Chinese dish served in Mainland China, Taiwan, Hong Kong, Macau, and places with Chinese diaspora. It is categorized as a tang shui 糖水 (pinyin: táng shuǐ) (literally translated as sugar water) or sweet soup. It is often served cold during the summer, and hot in the winter. Leftover red bean soup can also be frozen to make ice pops and is a popular dessert.

In Cantonese cuisine, a red bean soup made from rock sugar, sun-dried tangerine peels, and lotus seeds is commonly served as a dessert at the end of a restaurant or banquet meal. Common variations include the addition of ingredients such as sago (西米, pinyin: xī mi), tapioca, coconut milk, ice cream, glutinous rice balls, or purple rice. The two types of sugar used interchangeably are rock sugar and sliced sugar.

Similar dishes 
Unsweetened red bean porridge made with red beans and rice is eaten across China and East Asia. Japan has a similar variant called Shiruko.  It is called hóngdòuzhōu in Chinese, patjuk in Korean, and azukigayu in Japanese.

Vietnamese cuisine also has a similar dish, called chè đỗ đen. It contains added coconut milk and sugar. It is served cold.

See also 

 Red bean ice
 Red bean paste
 Red bean shaved ice
 List of bean soups
 List of Chinese soups
 List of legume dishes
 List of soups

References 

Bean soups
Cantonese cuisine
Chinese desserts
Chinese soups
Cold soups
Legume dishes
Taiwanese soups